Great Alne Railway Station was a station in the village of Great Alne in Warwickshire on the Great Western Railway line from Alcester, Warwickshire to Bearley, Warwickshire.

The old railway station building, built on the Great Western Railway branch-line from Bearley to Alcester, opened in 1876  but is now converted to a residential dwelling. The station sat on the GWR's Alcester Branch linking their Hatton - Stratford Branch with the now defunct Midland Railway's Gloucester Loop Line south of Redditch. The line closed to passengers in 1917 only to reopen between 1922 but stopping again in 1939 for passenger use, apart from workers' trains to the nearby Castle Maudslay Motor Company's works from Coventry which ran until 1944. The line closed completely in 1951 with lifting of the track taking place shortly afterwards, parts of it still remain, however, as roads and footpaths, notably to Alcester.

References

Disused railway stations in Warwickshire
Railway stations in Great Britain opened in 1876
Railway stations in Great Britain closed in 1917
Railway stations in Great Britain opened in 1922
Railway stations in Great Britain closed in 1939
Former Great Western Railway stations